The 32nd PMPC Star Awards for Television honored the best in Philippine television programming from 2017 until 2018, 
as chosen by the Philippine Movie Press Club. The ceremony was held on October 14, 2018, at the Henry Lee Irwin Theater in Ateneo de Manila University, Quezon City,
and was aired the delayed telecast by ABS-CBN on October 28, 2018.
The ceremony was hosted by Julia Barretto, Raymond Gutierrez, Robi Domingo, Yassi Pressman and Jodi Sta. Maria.

The nominations were announced by the Press on October 5, 2018.

Winners and Nominees

Winners are listed first and highlighted in bold:

Networks

Programs

Personalities

Special Awards

Ading Fernando Lifetime Achievement Award
Herbert Bautista

Excellence in Broadcasting Lifetime Achievement Award
Arnold Clavio

German Moreno Power Tandem Award
Coco Martin and Yassi Pressman

Hall of Fame Award
ASAP (ABS-CBN 2) (Best Musical Variety Show)

Stars of the Night
Greg Hawkins (Male)
Julia Barretto (Female)

Glupa Glowing Guy and Gal
McCoy de Leon and Heaven Peralejo

Frontrow Celebrity of the Night
Ken Chan (Male)
Tori Garcia (Female)

Faces of the Night
Ken Chan (Male)
Yassi Pressman (Female)

Most major nominations

Most major wins

Performers

References

See also 
PMPC Star Awards for TV
2018 in Philippine television

PMPC Star Awards for Television
2018 in Philippine television